St. Paul College, Pasig, also referred to as SPCP or SPC Pasig, is a private, Roman Catholic school exclusively for girls in Pasig, Philippines run by the Congregation of Sisters of Saint Paul of Chartres, a teaching order founded as the Daughters of the School.

St. Paul College, Pasig, is located in St. Paul Road, Brgy. Ugong, Pasig, Philippines. It was established in 1970 when Saint Paul University Manila (then St. Paul College, Manila) decided to relocate their kindergarten, grade school and high school departments to a different area.

History
The Sisters of St. Paul of Chartres first arrived in the Philippines on October 29, 1904, on the invitation of Bishop Frederick Z. Rooker of Jaro, Iloilo to open a school in Dumaguete for the "protection of faith". Other invitations followed and more Sisters arrived for a hospital in Iloilo, schools in Vigan, Tuguegarao, and Manila, and a leprosarium in Culion.

The Congregation is now serving forty schools all over the Philippines aside from hospitals and pastoral communities.

Administration

Directresses
Sister Marie Marcelle Navarro, SPC (1979-1982)
Sister Mary Magdalen Torres, SPC (1982-1995)
Sister Teresita Baricaua, SPC (1995-1997, as acting directress; 1997–2000, as directress)
Sister Bernadette Racadio, SPC (2000-2005)
Sister Teresita Baricaua, SPC (2005-2012)
Sister Dedicacion Rosario, SPC (2012–2021)
Sister Felicitas Bernardo, SPC (2021-Present)
Source:

Notable alumnae

Krissy and Ericka Villongco - music duo
Sharon Cuneta - actress, singer, daughter of late Mayor Pablo Cuneta
Cherie Gil - actress, socialite, member of the Eigenmann family
Janella Salvador - actress, member of the Salvador family of thespians
Alexa Ilacad - actress
Emmanuelle Vera - international beauty queen, occasional actress
Julia Barretto - actress, daughter of Marjorie Barretto and Dennis Padilla
Gabbi Garcia - actress
Janine Gutierrez - actress, member of the Gutierrez family
Lotlot de Leon - actress, daughter of Nora Aunor and Christopher de Leon
Sheryl Cruz - actress, singer, member of the Cruz family
Gelli de Belen - actress
Antoinette Jadaone - filmmaker
Grace Lee - South Korean-born disc jockey and television host
Denise Laurel - actress, singer, member of the prominent Laurel family
Grace Poe - Senator, MTRCB board member, daughter of Susan Roces and Fernando Poe Jr.
Liezl Martinez - actress, MTRCB board member, daughter of Amalia Fuentes and Romeo Vasquez
BP Valenzuela - singer
Belle Mariano - actress

References

External links
 

Educational institutions established in 1970
Catholic elementary schools in Metro Manila
Catholic secondary schools in Metro Manila
Schools in Pasig
Girls' schools in the Philippines